WMBT may refer to:

 WMBT-LP, a low-power radio station (90.1 FM) licensed to serve Gainesville, Florida, United States
 Tioman Airport (ICAO code WMBT)